Daryl Price (born October 23, 1972) is a former American football defensive end. He played in the National Football League (NFL) for the San Francisco 49ers from 1996 to 1997.

References

1972 births
Living people
American football defensive ends
Colorado Buffaloes football players
San Francisco 49ers players